TVN Gra was an interactive games channel that launched in March 2005 as part of the TVN network, owned by ITI Group. It featured contests, game shows and quizzes. It also used technology to allow the viewer to interact and play along at home. Series included: Rozbij Bank ("Hit the Bank"), an interactive show consisting of different letter and picture games; and Seans Filmowy ("Movie Show"), a program featuring film-based quizzes and games..

Unfortunately the channel didn’t reach that goal and closed down on 31 May 2008 due to low viewership. It has survived only two years in the television market. The channels frequencies were taken by Mango 24 (also a channel from ITI Group) on the satellite, but since Mango 24 already had a slot on the satellite, after 3 months of broadcasting it stopped airing on the new frequencies.

References

TVN (Polish TV channel)
Defunct television channels in Poland
Television channels and stations established in 2005
Television channels and stations disestablished in 2008
2005 establishments in Poland
2008 disestablishments in Poland